Coyolar is a district of the Orotina canton, in the Alajuela province of Costa Rica.

Geography 
Coyolar has an area of  km2 and an elevation of  metres.

Demographics 

For the 2011 census, Coyolar had a population of  inhabitants.

Transportation

Road transportation 
The district is covered by the following road routes:
 National Route 27
 National Route 34
 National Route 757

References 

Districts of Alajuela Province
Populated places in Alajuela Province